Andrei Svyatoslavovich Guzienko (15 April 1964 – 14 May 2019) was a Ukrainian footballer.

Club career
Born in Magnitogorsk, Chelyabinsk Oblast, Russian SSR, Soviet Union, he started playing in the football academy of RSDYUSHOR Frunze. He then started playing as senior in early 1980s in Frunze clubs Semetey, Alga and TSOR in the Soviet third league. In 1984, he moved to PFC CSKA Moscow and played in the Soviet First League. In 1985 and 1986 he played in Soviet top tier with Chornomorets Odesa. Then, after a season-long spell with Prykarpattya Ivano-Frankivsk, he played four seasons with Bukovyna Chernivtsi. In 1990, he moved abroad to Yugoslavia and joined Serbian club FK Bečej playing with them two seasons in the Yugoslav Second League. In 1992, he returned to, now independent, Ukraine, and played with Lada Chernivtsi and Dnister Zalishchyky before retiring.

References

1964 births
2019 deaths
People from Magnitogorsk
Ukrainian footballers
Association football forwards
FC Alga Bishkek players
PFC CSKA Moscow players
FC Chornomorets Odesa players
FC Prykarpattia Ivano-Frankivsk (2004) players
FC Bukovyna Chernivtsi players
Soviet First League players
OFK Bečej 1918 players
Expatriate footballers in Yugoslavia
Soviet expatriate footballers
FC Lada Chernivtsi players
FC Dnister Zalishchyky players
Sportspeople from Chelyabinsk Oblast